The 2018–19 Senior Women's T20 League was the 11th edition of the women's Twenty20 cricket competition in India. It was held from 20 February to 13 March 2019. Delhi were the defending champions.

The tournament had five groups, with four groups containing seven teams and one group with eight teams. The top two teams in each group qualified for the Super League stage of the tournament, with the teams split into two further groups of five teams. Delhi and Himachal from Group A, Assam and Maharashtra from Group B, Railways and Jharkhand from Group C, Karnataka and Punjab from Group D and Madhya Pradesh and Odisha from Group E qualified for the Super League stage. The top team from each Super League group, Punjab from Super League Group A  and Karnataka from Super League Group B progressed to the final. Punjab beat Karnataka by 4 runs to win the tournament.

In Group E's Round 2 fixture between Mizoram and Madhya Pradesh, Mizoram was all out for 9 runs with 9 batters scoring ducks. Apurwa Bhardwaj was the only batter to get off the mark for Mizoram.

League stage

Points table
Group A

Group B

Group C

Group D

Group E

Fixtures

Group A

Group B

Group C

Group D

Group E

Super League Stage

Points table

Super League Group A

Super League Group B

Fixtures

Super League Group A

Super League Group B

Final

References

Women's Senior T20 Trophy
2018–19 Indian women's cricket
Domestic cricket competitions in 2018–19